Public engagement or public participation is a term that has recently been used to describe "the practice of involving members of the public in the agenda-setting, decision-making, and policy-forming activities of organizations/institutions responsible for policy development." It is focused on the participatory actions of the public to aid in policy making based in their values.

Origins
The tradition of a decision-making body getting inputs from those with less power is generally known as "consultation". This became popular with UK governments during the 1980s and 1990s.  Even though most governments that carry out consultations are democratically elected, many people who became involved in these processes were surprised that conduct of such "consultations" was unsatisfactory in at least three respects.

 Groups that already had influence were often the only ones consulted
 People who did not have the resources would usually not be able to be part of a consultation, even if the decision it was meant to influence might have a major impact on them.
 There were no agreed safeguards against consultations being used cynically by decision-makers to make it look like they had sought to canvass other opinions, while in fact having set a new policy in place even before it asked the question.

As early as 1979, science analyst Dorothy Nelkin pointed out that much of what passed for participation in governance could best be understood as attempts by the powerful to co-opt the public.

Rationale
Public engagement is a relatively new term, hardly used before the late 1990s. The existing term it shares most in common with is participatory democracy, discussed by thinkers such as Jean-Jacques Rousseau, John Stuart Mill and G D H Cole.

Many see participatory democracy as complementing representative democratic systems, in that it puts decision-making powers more directly in the hands of ordinary people. Rousseau suggested that participatory approaches to democracy had the advantage of demonstrating that "no citizen is a master of another" and that, in society, "all of us are equally dependent on our fellow citizens". Rousseau suggested that participation in decision – making increases feeling among individual citizens that they belong in their community.  Perhaps the most long-standing institution of participatory democracy is the system of trial by jury.

Whilst elected governments make the laws, it is therefore juries that are able to decide the innocence or guilt of anyone charged with breaking many of those laws, making it a key instrument of participatory democracy. Over the centuries they have achieved an importance to many democracies that have had to be fiercely defended. One senior judge surveying the limiting of a government's power provided by the jury over the centuries compared the jury to: "a little parliament... No tyrant could afford to leave a subject's freedom in the hands of twelve of his countrymen.... Trial by jury is more than an instrument of justice and more than one wheel of the constitution: it is the lamp that shows that freedom lives". (Patrick Devlin 1956). Today, jury trials are practised in many democracies around the world including the US, UK, Russia, Spain, Brazil and Australia. Perhaps no other institution of government rivals the jury in placing power so directly in the hands of citizens, or wagers more on the truth of democracy's core claim that the people make their own best governors. Juries are therefore argued to be the most widespread form of genuine consultation at work in society today.

The tension between the state and civil society as underscored by Public Engagement within Newly Industrialized Economies (NIE) such as Singapore is illustrated by Kenneth Paul Tan of the Lee Kuan Yew School of Public Policy

But speaking about public engagement is, of course, quite a different thing from carrying out public engagement. And this is where there seems to be a gap between rhetoric and practice in Singapore. For instance, government officials recently met selectively with concerned members of the public to discuss a controversial decision to build a road through a historically significant graveyard. When criticised for not taking the public's views seriously, the Government explained that the meeting was never meant to be a "consultation". So it is important to ask why such a gap exists and why it might be difficult to close it, assuming of course that closing it is what we want to do."

As a neo-liberal global city, Singapore has been witnessing rising popular pressure. Politics has come to the fore again, prompting the policy establishment to pay greater heed to the demands of a new and more variegated citizenry, with political leaders now more sensitive to the real prospect of losing elections. At the same time, the cultural, ideological, practical and institutional legacies of the earlier survivalist and development stages continue to be a source of tension in the evolution of Singapore's political culture. By no means has this been a simple and linear story of liberalisation.
However, are these recent developments enough to shift the deeply entrenched public sector mindsets that have been formed out of historically shaped ways of thinking and reasoning? Will a new generation of leaders in the public sector, whose horizons of experience may differ from the survivalist and developmental preoccupations of a previous generation, lead to fresh opportunities for new terms of engagement?

The elitist proclivities of the public sector, reinforced by top-level salaries that are comparable to the private sector, are unlikely to incentivise real public engagement, since they reinforce the sense that public sector leaders, possessing superior intellect, knowledge and insight, must defend the public interest against irrational and dangerous mass populism. The public, according to this mindset, needs to be educated to think correctly rather than present themselves as equal participants in policy formulation and implementation.

Modalities of engagement 
It is important to note that the participation of the public can occur at many different levels. Due to this ambiguity, modalities for public engagement have been categorized based on the types of information flow and level of involvement of the public and/or sponsor (i.e. academia, government, private sector):

Public communication is characterized by the top-down, one-way transfer of information or resources from initiators of an engagement, like government agencies to the public and where feedback from the public is not returned. This includes mechanisms like information broadcasts, static website resources, newsletters, public service announcements, or informational outreach through the legacy and social media. Traditional media functions in this way by influencing the public agenda, termed agenda-setting theory.

Public consultation is the collection of feedbacks and information about or from the public with the sponsor. Potential mechanisms are referendum, surveys, focus groups, or interactive websites. These mechanisms gather information from the public who are or will be affected by those decisions to shape what sponsors focus on or invest their resources into. Although public consultation involves soliciting public feedbacks, it is still a one-way flow of information, but in the reverse direction of public communication. The initiators of public consultation retain decision-making authority.

Public involvement is interactive and involves the transfer of fact-based information, values, and beliefs between both the public and the sponsor (i.e., typically, experts or policy makers). Deliberative opinion polls serve as a mechanism in which the public's opinions are collected before and after receiving information from the sponsor.

Social media has become an increasingly prominent mechanism of public involvement as well. Social media allows for instant and on-going dialogue between sponsors and the public. Additionally, social is flexible and can be implemented in a variety of ways, but not all social media platforms function identically. For example, three major health organizations implemented social media campaigns during the Ebola epidemic of 2013: Centers for Disease Control and Prevention (CDC), World Health Organization (WHO), and Médecins Sans Frontières (MSF, also known as Doctors without Borders). All three organizations used both Twitter and Instagram to communicate with the public, but the public engaged with Instagram posts more often than Twitter. This finding is consistent with Visual communication theory. Additionally, each organization fostered a different level of engagement with the public (MSF garnered the highest engagement).

Public collaboration is another form of two-way dialogue, but it also involves collaboration between the public and sponsor where they actively work together to identify and create suitable solutions to the challenges under discussion. Mechanisms for public participation include action planning workshops, citizens' jury, consensus conferences, and task forces.

Public empowerment is where the decision-making authority is placed majorly, if not solely, on the public in which they are provided with enough information from the sponsor and collectively come to a formal decision. This decision is then binding on the affected public. This is the rarest engagement mechanism, because the sponsors (i.e., policy makers and regulatory actors) are not allowed to transfer their decision-making authority to the public.

Good practice
Taking participatory democracy as an ideal for public engagement has significant consequences for how we apply the concept to issues with a scientific or technical element. Instead of merely receiving inputs from various interested parties, a participatory model of consultation forces decision-makers to recognise the democratic accountability of their actions not merely every few years at elections, but in a more systematic, direct sense to citizens.

A common misconception is that there is a particular methodology that can be devised to facilitate all public engagement. Effective participation, by contrast, is conducted on the assumption that each different situation will require a different design, using a new combination of tools as part of an evolving cycle of action and reflection by the institution involved.

Each "experiment" in participatory democracy contains a unique mix of people and institutions. Each method must therefore select elements from a range of different approaches. Participation is also overtly "political" in that it is about humans, power and knowledge – all of which are inherently complex and which together make for a potent mix that requires sensitivity and careful planning. So while participatory processes can be replicated in the same way as scientific protocols, their human ingredients can differ so much that a concentration on replicating what happened elsewhere often hinders the practical application of a technique. Each consultation event needs to proceed from an understanding of its political, scientific, institutional and practical constraints.

The effectiveness of public engagement methods can be assessed by their fairness and efficiency in achieving its purpose. Fairness addresses whether the public perceives their information was collected by sponsors in a way that equally represents the affected population. Although, scholars suggest that assessing fairness of public engagement is a complexity in itself. Efficiency "refers to maximizing the relevant information (knowledge and/or opinions) from the maximum number of relevant sources and transferring this efficiently to the appropriate receivers." Much of the effectiveness of public engagement methods rely on how these methods are conducted and if they are at the will of interfering biases or confounding variables.

So instead of recommending a perfect method of public engagement, working principles for such processes based on those used by PEALS at Newcastle University are listed below.

Nine principles 
Participants should join those organising the process in setting terms of reference for the whole exercise, and framing the questions that they will discuss.
The group organising, or in overall control of, the process should be broad based, including stakeholders with different interests on the subject being discussed.
There should be a diversity of information sources and perspectives available to participants.
There should be space for the perspectives of those participants who lack specialist knowledge of the area concerned to engage in a two-way exchange with those possessing specialist knowledge.
There should be complete transparency of the activities carried out within the process to those both inside and outside it.
Those without a voice in policy-making should be enabled to use the consultation process as a tool for positive political change. This should be embedded in the process by sufficient funds being made available for follow-up work after their initial conclusions have been reached.
The process should contain safeguards against decision-makers using a process to legitimise existing assumptions or policies.
All groups involved in the process should be given the opportunity to identify possible strategies for longer-term learning, development and change on a range of issues relating to their conclusions.
The group organising, or in overall control of, the process should develop an audit trail through the process, to explain whether policies were changed, what was taken into account, what criteria were applied when weighing up the evidence from the process, and therefore how the views of those involved in the participatory process may have made a difference. This should be explored together with as many those involved in all levels of the process as possible.

In science and technology

The movement for public engagement in science and technology grows out of a paradox: the steadily increasing number of ways citizens can learn about science has not always been matched by increased levels of scientific knowledge or sophistication among citizens.  There are nearly one hundred science and technology museums in North America alone, numerous science blogs (the aggregation site, ScienceBlogs, reported 152 thousand posts and 3.3 million comments for 61 blogs alone before it closed in October 2017), and a proliferating number of science magazines.

However, surveys of scientific literacy show a long term pattern in which Americans have only a moderate understanding of basic scientific facts and concepts.  In 1992, only 59% of adults sampled could give correct answers to a series of scientific terms and concepts; in 2008 the number was 64%. But in 2010, the presentation of these same measures of scientific literacy became controversial. Americans performed much worse on questions about evolution and the Big Bang theory than respondents from different countries. These differences disappeared when short caveats like, "According to the theory of Evolution..." were added to the questions – pointing to a larger conflict between scientific knowledge and personal beliefs in the U.S. Another survey found widening gaps in knowledge of nanotechnology between the most and least educated. Knowledge gaps also exist between different levels of education different media use. These gaps between education levels and knowledge make public engagement with science complex.

On the other hand, modern information technologies including the Internet have shown potential to close education-based knowledge gaps. One study found increased science Internet and television use had potential to narrow or reduce knowledge gaps that are based on educational discrepancies.

To address this disconnect and complexity, there have been calls for new ways of connecting citizens with science in hopes that citizens can do more than respond passively to choices made by experts, and instead actually contribute to shaping science policy as it is made. This engagement of different publics in the policymaking process happens through the flow of information between the relevant publics and the sponsor of the engagement (e.g., policy makers, experts, scientists, community organizations).

Future goals for public engagement surrounding controversial scientific topics 
In 2021, scholars identified goals for effective public engagement around emerging science-based technologies such as CRISPR. In this context, public engagement was defined as “processes and initiatives focused on enabling public participation in the responsible innovation and development of new technologies, including the management and assessment of technological risk.”  The goals are:

 Avoid potential controversy - scientists must instill a sense of trust among the public and be willing to listen to their feedback
 Educate the public - make information accessible to the public and appeal to "unreasonable objections" while understanding the efficacy of correcting knowledge deficits 
 Build democratic capacity through deliberation - create a knowledgeable public through various engagement initiatives that can voice inclusive/representative views to institutions or governing bodies 
 Widen the representation of voices - allow equal opportunity for representative groups to communicate their opinions, even if they greatly challenge those of "experts'"
 Solicit input on values-based debates triggered by science - have the public encourage the field of science to address moral and ethical issues early on
 Enable responsible innovation - allow opportunities for proactive public engagement throughout the scientific or discovery process
 Shape public policy - create initiatives where public engagement can have direct influence on policy making

Citizen science

Citizen science can be described as "public participation in scientific research," participatory monitoring, and participatory action research whose outcomes are often advancements in scientific research by improving the scientific community's capacity, as well as increasing the public's understanding of science. Citizen science has proliferated in the last decade, becoming a critical form of public engagement in science and an increasingly important research tool for the study of large-scale patterns in nature.

Deliberative democracy

Deliberative democracy is also a mechanism for public participation with potential implications for public engagement with science. It provides a structure for public participation about pending policy developments via public hearings, the mainstream media and the internet, consulting with different interest groups. This way, policy in the making is ideally informed by the knowledge and experiences of those who will be affected by it, works to engage the public before final decisions are made, and sometimes gives affected groups a share of power in policy developments. Researchers have argued that democratic deliberation should be as inclusive as possible, involving a wide representation of voices 

In situations of public deliberation, agencies must be on guard to see that all the important views are represented without raising expectations so high that all participants think their views will automatically be adopted as policy. Moreover, evaluation to ensure the effectiveness of public engagement is also important.

Although democratic deliberation can be an effective form of public engagement, some have suggested that these “contexts and styles of interaction are often difficult to produce and to facilitate” and they often fail to scale up. Especially on scientific topics, much public discussion takes place on platforms such as social media, which are inherently limited in their democratic and inclusive capacities.

In addition, a Pew Research Center report from 2018 reported that an increasing number of Americans find it stressful just to discuss politics with those they disagree with. This has implications for public deliberation of science in an age when an increasing number of scientific issues, such as COVID-19 or climate change, are entangled with political affiliations.

Public engagement with science was formally called for in the Third Report of the UK House of Lords Committee on Science and Technology, which argued that "public confidence in science and policy based on science has been eroded in recent year....there is a new humility on the part of science in the face of public attitudes, and a new assertiveness on the part of the public."  One consultation, on the regulation of biotechnology in 1998, involved six two-day workshops as well as a large-scale survey.  Asked who should be involved in regulating biotechnology, between 40 and 50 percent of respondents said regulatory groups should include a mixed advisory body, an expert body, scientists themselves, the general public, government, and environmental groups.  One advisor to the Office of Science and Technology said the process was time-consuming and expensive, and workshops were open to the charge of being run by their organizers rather than their participants, but he still felt the participants dealt with the issues and came to understand them.

Scientists’ Public Engagement Goals, Attitudes, and Incentives in the U.S. and Canada

Surveys of scholars in the U.S. and Canada reveal North American scientists’ willingness to endorse certain public engagement goals, as well as their attitudes toward and incentives for public communication activities.

A 2020 survey-based study found researchers in the U.S. and Canada are quite willing, overall, to endorse various public engagement goals. The goals they were most willing to pursue were ensuring policymakers use scientific evidence, ensuring culture values science, securing adequate funding for research, helping people use science to make better individual decisions, and fulfilling a duty to society.

Additionally, a 2020 census of over 6,000 researchers at 46 universities across the U.S. gauged scientists’ attitudes and perceived incentives toward public communication activities. It found that while a majority of the scientists personally considered public engagement highly important, many scholars still perceived barriers to actually carrying out such engagement. For instance, majorities of the participants did not think that most of their colleagues found public engagement highly important, nor did majorities believe the residents of their state or their department chairs found engagement activities to be of high importance. Notably, the study also found higher levels of support for public engagement activities among younger scientists than among their older counterparts.

Critiques of modern public engagement strategies 
One-way information transfer is characteristic of the knowledge deficit model of science communication, which posits that providing the public with more information should align the public's beliefs with the best available science. However, in the U.S., on contentious topics in science, this model has shown weak empirical support. Educating individuals has the potential to fuel motivated reasoning and created even greater polarized views on subjects. This has been shown with individuals’ beliefs, attitudes, and behaviors about issues like climate change, the Big Bang and human evolution.

Selective exposure theory postulates that individuals favor information that agrees with their beliefs over information that contradicts those beliefs. Experimental evidence supports this theory. Individuals sometimes also form a filter bubble of like-minded people who hold a similar belief structure, decreasing the amount of dissonant information they are likely to encounter. Public engagement with science can have further unintended (but often unmeasured) consequences like the "backfire" effect, which occurs when individuals receive scientific information contrary to their prior beliefs and subsequently double down on their existing beliefs, whether or not those views are accurate.

Some have argued that many processes designed for public engagement do not allow the public to say “no” to emerging research or technologies. For example, bioethics commissions established in the 1960s by Congress were supposedly designed to mediate engagement between scientists, lawmakers and the public. However, such commissions have been criticized for have weak democratic accountability and not representing the public's views, even if they adopt an approach based on moral principles (principlism).

Examples of public engagement 
 Americans Discuss Social Security, which engaged 50,000 Americans in all fifty states over fifteen months in 1998 and 1999.  During that period, President Clinton and 120 members of Congress took part in town meetings and teleconferences.  The project's sponsors state that it "demonstrated the intense public interest in the future of Social Security reform and showed that Americans had more of a "middle ground" approach than special interests or lawmakers had believed. For example, contrary to insiders' expectations, participants overwhelmingly supported raising the cap on payroll taxes."
 Listening To The City, which brought 5,000 people from New York City and the tri-state area to the Javits Center in July 2002, to discuss the future of lower Manhattan.  A separate series of 26 online dialogues involved an additional 800 participants over two weeks.  The purpose was to insure broad participation in redevelopment of the World Trade Center site and listen to citizens' ideas about the proposed memorial.  According to the final report, 80% of participants were satisfied or very satisfied with the result.
 Voices & Choices, a 16-county civic engagement process aimed at involving citizens in the economic future of northeast Ohio in 2008.  Major agenda items included school funding, government fragmentation and inefficiency, racial isolation and inequalities and creating a competitive workforce. The resulting meetings engaged 21,000 people.  This included one-on-one interviews with three thousand people as well as eleven workshops attended by 15,000 more people.  Nine hundred citizens took part in an additional town meeting aimed at identifying goals the region needed to adopt to overcome its most significant challenges.  There were also leadership workshops for 1000 government and business leaders.  The three top goals that emerged were  planning for the future development and growth of the region, ensuring students have the financial resources they need to succeed, and improving workforce training programs.  90% of regional town meeting participants described them as excellent or good. (www.futurefundneo.org/~/media/Final_VoicesChoices_Report.ashx)
 Danish Consensus Conferences, the first of which was originally held in 1987 and organized by the Danish Technology Board, explicitly designed to inform public policy. These conferences have subsequently been held in countries other than Denmark but have shown limited success, with majorities of policymakers reporting to have usually not read the resulting reports.
Events in museums and public spaces can be used to successfully communicate with the public 
Events within higher education institutions such as universities can also be impactful

Constraints of public meeting efforts

The following intrinsic and extrinsic constraints of public meetings can lead to unexpected a misrepresentation of the overall public's opinions:

1. Attendance in public meetings is low and highly selective

Although citizens express their intention to participate in public engagement activities, in real world, they are less likely to show up. For example, the average turnout at annual town meetings in Massachusetts in 1996 was 7.6 percent which was much lower than the average municipal election turnout of 31.1 percent. Low turnout rate in public meetings can lead serious sampling biases when attendees and non-attendees significantly differ in their interests. For example, attendees can be more interested in politics and involved in more personal discourses than non-attendees. In this case, their opinions can be slanted to one side.

2. Group dynamics and personality traits of participants

Depending the makeup of participants, group dynamics and personality characteristics of participants can considerably affect the outcomes of discussions. A small number of outspoken participants can make more than half of the comments during the discussions while least outspoken members make a very small portion of the comments.

3. Moderated/controlled settings of public meetings
In order to minimize the potential effects of participants' demographic and cognitive characteristics on conversations, public meetings or consensus conferences tend to be carefully moderated and guided by facilitators. In such artificial setting, participants may behave in different ways that may differ from what is likely to occur in real-world discussions.

4. Spillovers from public meetings to real-world discussion

The social implication effect of follow-up media coverage of public meetings or other engaging events may help transfer issues from these small group discussions to the broader community. However, in the case of the U.S., a spillover effect from public meetings into media discourse are minimal at best.

5. Knowledge gap issues

Public meetings and consensus conferences may create knowledge gaps between high SES and less SES participants. The demographic, prepositional and cognitive differences between two groups in public meeting may lead to differing outcomes of public engagement. For example, highly educated participants may learn more from discussions and dominate the conversation while less educated members listen to their arguments. Furthermore, only small proportions of the population who may be already informed attend public meetings while the majority of the population who may need information the most do not. In such case, any public engagement effort may widen existing gaps further.

See also
For examples of public engagement, see also:
 Citizens' assembly
 Community x-change
 Internet 2.0
 Participatory democracy
 Participatory economics
 Participatory justice
 Public participation

References

Political science
Engagement